Alessandro Strozzi may refer to:
Alessandro Strozzi (bishop of Arezzo) (1631–1682), Italian Roman Catholic prelate
Alessandro Strozzi (archbishop of Fermo) (died 1621), Italian Roman Catholic prelate
Alessandro Strozzi (bishop of San Miniato) (died 1648), Italian Roman Catholic prelate
Alessandro Strozzi (bishop of Volterra) (died 1568) Italian Roman Catholic prelate